Wąchock  is a town in Starachowice County, Świętokrzyskie Voivodeship, Poland, near Starachowice, within the historical region of Lesser Poland. In 2006, it had 2,777 inhabitants.

History
Wachock received its town charter in 1454, lost it in 1869, and regained in 1994.

Wąchock is first mentioned in historical records from 1179. In the 13th century, a Cistercian abbey was founded here, and today its buildings form the most notable sight in the town. The abbey emerged as one of the richest institutions of this kind. Monks from Wąchock contributed to the development of early industry along the Kamienna river, opening metal plants in several locations. In 1454, Wąchock received its Magdeburg rights from King Kazimierz Jagiellończyk, and the town, together with the abbey, was frequently raided and destroyed - by the Mongols in 1259–1260 (see Mongol invasion of Poland), the Swedes in 1655, and the Transilvanians in 1657 (see The Deluge). In 1819, the abbey was taken over by the government of Russian-controlled Congress Poland, and the monks did not return there until 1951.

Despite the existence of a rich and powerful monastery, Wąchock itself never became an important center of Lesser Poland’s Sandomierz Voivodeship, to which it belonged until the Partitions of Poland (1795). This was because both Bishops of Kraków (who owned nearby town of Bodzentyn), and Benedictine monks from the Łysa Góra monastery blocked any attempts at Wąchock's development. In 1624, Benedictines from Święty Krzyż founded the town of Wierzbnik (later: Starachowice), which emerged as a competition to Wąchock. Nevertheless, Wąchock was one of early centers of Polish industry - in 1500, out of 289 forges in the Kingdom of Poland, as many as 22 operated here.

In January 1863, soon after the January Uprising broke out, General Marian Langiewicz assembled a group of 1,400 Polish rebels, whose purpose was to attack Russian-held Warsaw. A battle with the Russians took place here on February 3, 1863. In 1869, Russian authorities, in revenge of the town's aid to the insurgents, deprived Wąchock of its city rights. The village was flooded by the Kamienna river in 1903, and in 1918, it became part of Second Polish Republic’s Kielce Voivodeship. During World War II, Home Army units under Jan Piwnik were particularly active in the area of Wąchock. There now is a monument of Jan Piwnik in the town.

The town lies on National Road Nr. 42, and has a rail station on a route from Skarżysko-Kamienna to Sandomierz.

Culture

Points of interest
Among major points of interest are:
 Complex of Cistercian church and abbey (12th century),
 Roman parish church (13th century), with additions from the 16th and 19th centuries, and the 17th century interior,
 ruins of a metal plant (first half of the 19th century),
 former roadside inn, which was the headquarters of Marian Langiewicz in the 1860s.

Humour

Wąchock is famous across Poland for jokes about its inhabitants, and especially their sołtys (referring to the times when Wąchock was a village). For example, the cat of the sołtys was so smart that when given some coffee with milk, he drank all the milk while leaving all the coffee. It is unclear when and why Wąchock had become a butt of the jokes, although there are several theories.

Typically, the Wąchock jokes are the question-answer ones: "Why nobody in Wąchock watches TV now? - Because sołtys put blinds on his windows."

The town organizes the annual meeting of sołtyses.

See also
 by Kamienna river

References

Cities and towns in Świętokrzyskie Voivodeship
Starachowice County
Sandomierz Voivodeship
Radom Governorate
Kielce Voivodeship (1919–1939)